Niamh Perry (born 10 June 1990) is a Northern Irish singer and actress who is best known for playing Fleck in the Andrew Lloyd Webber musical Love Never Dies. She came to prominence when she competed as one of the finalists in the BBC talent show-themed television series I'd Do Anything in 2008.

Early life
Born in Bangor, County Down, Perry attended Our Lady and St. Patrick's College, Knock but left during her A-Levels in early 2008 and moved to London to compete in I'd Do Anything.

In 2007, she achieved a Distinction in her Grade eight classical singing examination, for which she won the South Eastern Education and Library Board (SEELB) Outstanding Achievement Award for Contribution to the Arts She was a member of Music Theatre for Youth (MT4UTH) from when the company was founded in 2005 and she was also a member of the MT4UTH Showcase group, Footlighters. She performed with MT4UTH in productions of Sweet Charity, in which she played the lead role of Charity, Oliver!, Joseph and the Amazing Technicolor Dreamcoat, Guys and Dolls and West Side Story.  She also sang a solo at the re-opening of the Grand Opera House in Belfast.

In February 2008, Perry took part in an NSPCC campaign encouraging adults to call the NSPCC Child Protection Helpline if they had concerns about a child's welfare.

Singing career
In March 2008, Perry was announced as one of the final 12 contestants in the BBC1 programme I'd Do Anything, which premiered on 15 March 2008 and aimed to find a performer to play Nancy in a West End revival of the musical Oliver!. Perry was eliminated from the show in week eight  but has since gone on to have a successful career in musical theatre.

Perry played the lead role of Belle in the musical Only the Brave, which had its world premiere at the Edinburgh Festival Fringe on 31 July 2008 at the George Square theatre and ran until 25 August. On 13 September 2008 she performed alongside fellow I'd Do Anything finalist Rachel Tucker at the Proms in the Park, held at Belfast City Hall as part of the nationwide celebration of the BBC Last Night of the Proms.
 
Perry was a featured vocalist with the BBC Concert Orchestra on the BBC Radio 2 programme Friday Night is Music Night in October 2008, performing "When I Close My Eyes" from Only The Brave and "Maybe I Like it This Way" from the musical The Wild Party.

On 16 November 2008, Perry sang at St Paul's Cathedral in the City of London at a fundraising and awareness raising event for Save the Children. She was the joint lead vocalist with opera singer Mark Stone as they sang the premiere performance of "The Cry, a requiem for a lost child".

She appeared in pantomime at the Devonshire Park Theatre in Eastbourne, East Sussex from 12 December 2008 to 11 January 2009 in Show White and the Seven Dwarfs playing the lead role of Snow White alongside Stefan Booth.

In May 2009, Andrew Lloyd Webber revealed on an episode of 'Friday Night with Jonathan Ross' that Perry would be singing one of the roles on the Original Cast Recording for Love Never Dies, the sequel to Phantom of the Opera, describing her as "wonderful".

On Monday 15 June 2009, Niamh began playing the lead role of Sophie Sheridan in Mamma Mia! The Musical at the Prince of Wales Theatre, London, with Sally Ann Triplett as Donna.

Niamh toured the UK in 2010/11 with Lee Mead on his concert tour. On 19 March 2011 she was the wedding singer for the BBC Three live musical drama Frankenstein's Wedding.

In the Eurovision Song Contest 2011, held in Germany that year, each country had a jury, whose votes would be added to the general public's. The jury was made up of professionals in the music industry; Niamh was one of the jury panel for the United Kingdom.

From December 2011 – January 2012 Niamh Perry played the title role in the French classic children's novel, The Little Prince. It was the world premier of the musical adaptation of the French classic, written by Andrew Lloyd Webber's son Nicholas and James D Reid. The production was performed in the Lyric Theatre, Belfast.

Niamh was one of the original four cast members of a Song Cycle for Soho which ran at Soho Theatre from February to March 2012. Her vocals also feature on the original cast album for this production.

Later in 2012, Perry gained positive reviews for her portrayal of Kim in the Boy George musical Taboo.

Perry went on to impress as Johanna Barker in Sweeney Todd: The Demon Barber of Fleet Street at the West Yorkshire Playhouse and then at Royal Exchange, Manchester.

In February 2014, it was announced that Perry had been selected to lead the cast of the revival of Andrew Lloyd Webber musical The Beautiful Game when it returned to London. She went on to receive much critical acclaim for her portrayal of Mary.

In was announced in February 2017 that Perry would be playing the part of Girl in the award-winning musical Once during its return to Dublin in the summer of 2017.

Thomas & Friends

Perry was confirmed as the voice of Dash by Joel Beckford. She performed a festive Wombles classic "Wombling Merry Christmas" together with Joel Beckford, Jessie Buckley, Jon Moses and the new series narrator Laura Whitmore, who did the narrating interlude.

Filmography

Television

Theatre Credits

References

External links 

1990 births
Living people
People educated at Our Lady and St. Patrick's College, Knock
21st-century women singers from Northern Ireland